NGC 1510 is a dwarf lenticular galaxy approximately 38 million light-years away from Earth in the constellation of Horologium. It was discovered by John Herschel on December  4, 1836.

Gravitational interaction with NGC 1512

NGC 1510 is under the influence of gravitational tidal forces of the large neighbour barred spiral galaxy NGC 1512. The two galaxies are separated by only ∼5 arcmin (13.8 kpc), and are in the process of a lengthy merger which has been going on for 400 million years. At the end of this process NGC 1512 will have cannibalised its smaller companion.

See also 
 Lenticular galaxy 
 Dwarf galaxy
 Interacting galaxy
 List of NGC objects (1001–2000)
 Horologium

References

External links 

 
 SEDS

Dwarf galaxies
Lenticular galaxies
Interacting galaxies
Horologium (constellation)
1510
014375
Astronomical objects discovered in 1836
Discoveries by John Herschel
Dorado Group